Praxis: Journal of Gender and Cultural Critiques is a peer-reviewed feminist journal established in 1989. From 1989 till 2009 it operated under the name Phoebe. The journal is published by the Women's & Gender Studies and Africana & Latino Studies Departments at the State University of New York.

References

External links 
 

English-language journals
Feminist journals
Publications established in 1989